Besford is a village and civil parish in the Wychavon district of Worcestershire, England.  According to the 2001 census it had a population of 147.  The village is near Pershore, off the road from Upton-upon-Severn. A historic house, Besford Court (a grade II* listed building), is located in the village. Besford Court was once used as a school known as Besford Court Hospital .

The village is reputedly haunted by the ghost of a member of the Seabright family, who appears in a nightshirt.

Further reading
 Victoria County History, Worcestershire, Vol.4, 1924, Besford

References

External links

Villages in Worcestershire
Wychavon